Barðaströnd is an area of historical interest in northwestern Iceland.  It is the coast between Vatnsfjörður and Sigluneshlíðar in southern Westfjords region. This is the place  where Flóki Vilgerðarson first set up winter camp.

External links
Tourist attractions near Barðaströnd
Barðaströnd at Visit.is (in Icelandic)

Subdivisions of Iceland